was a town located in Sōma District, Fukushima, Japan.

As of 2003, the town had an estimated population of 13,482 and a density of 146.62 persons per km². The total area was 91.95 km².

On January 1, 2006, Odaka, along with the city of Haramachi, and the town of Kashima (also from Sōma District), was merged to create the city of Minamisōma.

References

Dissolved municipalities of Fukushima Prefecture